was a Japanese sprinter who competed in the 1952 Summer Olympics.

References

1930 births
2020 deaths
Japanese male sprinters
Japanese male hurdlers
Olympic male sprinters
Olympic male hurdlers
Olympic athletes of Japan
Athletes (track and field) at the 1952 Summer Olympics
Asian Games gold medalists for Japan
Asian Games medalists in athletics (track and field)
Athletes (track and field) at the 1951 Asian Games
Medalists at the 1951 Asian Games
Japan Championships in Athletics winners
20th-century Japanese people
21st-century Japanese people